Abraq Khaytan or Abrag Khitan is a village in Kuwait. It is located 3 miles from Kuwait International Airport.

Nearby towns and villages include Al `Umariyah (0.8 nm), Al `Udayliyah (0.5 nm), Qurtubah (1.5 nm), As Surrah (1.5 nm), Al Farwaniyah (1.0 nm) and Janub Khaytan (1.3 nm).

External links
Satellite map at Maplandia.com

Populated places in Kuwait
Districts of Al Farwaniyah Governorate